Nicholas John Joyce (born 27 February 1947) is an English former professional footballer who played as a winger.

Career
Born in Leeds, Joyce signed for Bradford City in August 1971 from Leeds Ashley Road, leaving the club in 1972 During his time with Bradford City he made five appearances in the Football League, scoring once.

Sources

References

1947 births
Living people
English footballers
Leeds Ashley Road F.C. players
Bradford City A.F.C. players
English Football League players
Association football wingers